Tolnaftate (INN) is a synthetic thiocarbamate used as an anti-fungal agent that may be sold  without medical prescription in most jurisdictions. It is supplied as a cream, powder, spray, liquid, and liquid aerosol. Tolnaftate is used to treat fungal conditions such as jock itch, athlete's foot and ringworm.

Mechanism
Although the exact mechanism of action is not entirely known, it is believed to inhibit squalene epoxidase, an important enzyme in the biosynthetic pathway of ergosterol (a key component of the fungal cell membrane) in a similar way to terbinafine.

Uses
Tolnaftate has been found to be generally slightly less effective than azoles when used to treat tinea pedis (athlete's foot). It is, however, useful when dealing with ringworm, especially when passed from pets to humans.

Side effects 
Side effects that may occur include:
 allergic reactions like:
 skin rash
 itching or hives
 swelling of the face, lips, or tongue
 inflammation, redness, or pain at the affected area
Less severe side effects include:
 dry skin
 mild skin irritation, burning, or itching at the affected area

See also
 Liranaftate, a similar thiocarbamate antifungal

References

External links
 Medline's entry for tolnaftate

Antifungals
Naphthol esters
Thiocarbamates
Merck & Co. brands
Bayer brands
3-Tolyl compounds
2-Naphthyl compounds